In mathematics, more precisely in algebra, a prosolvable group (less common: prosoluble group) is a group that is isomorphic to the inverse limit of an inverse system of solvable groups. Equivalently, a group is called prosolvable, if, viewed as a topological group, every open neighborhood of the identity contains a normal subgroup whose corresponding quotient group is a solvable group.

Examples 
Therefore,  is solvable.

See also 
 Galois theory

References

Mathematical structures
Algebra
Number theory
Topology
Properties of groups
Topological groups